Tililing is a 2021 Philippine  musical black comedy film written and directed by Darryl Yap. Vincent Del Rosario III and Veronique Del Rosario-Corpus are the producers of the film. It stars Baron Geisler, Candy Pangilinan, Chad Kinis, Gina Pareño, Donnalyn Bartolome, Cai Cortez and Rez Cortez.

Synopsis
Three intern nurses get locked down in an asylum where they meet three special patients. Together, they attempt to escape before the other patients kill them.

Cast
 Baron Geisler as Peter
 Chad Kinis as Bernie
 Gina Pareño as Socorro
 Candy Pangilinan as Maricel
 Donnalyn Bartolome as Espie
 Yumi Lacsamana as Jessa
 Cai Cortez as Divina
 Rez Cortez as Peter's Father
 J.P. Herminigildo as Young Peter
 Liz Gonzaga as Young Socorro
 Edgie Flores as Yolly
 Loren Mariñas as Tabitha
 Paul Henderson as Chief Guard
 Erol De Guzman as Pulis
 Manuel Ambasa as Tatay ni Bernie
 Myrna Hidoc as Nanay ni Bernie
 Billy Jake Cortez as Felipe

Production
Tililing was originally a theater play entitled Turnilyo written also by Darryl Yap in 2009. The play was first performed at the Subic Bay Arts Center in 2010. By 2020, the film is already ready to be theatrically released but this plan was hampered by the COVID-19 pandemic.

Marketing

The initial film poster in early 2021 for Tililing featuring the characters making funny faces drew negative reception. The Commission on Human Rights believed that the poster promotes stigma and negative stereotypes of people experiencing mental health issues. The Psychological Association of the Philippines released a statement urging for responsible portrayal of mental health in media.Tililing was perceived to be a film made at the expense of people experiencing mental health issues but director Daryll Yap assured that the production team is "together" with mental health advocates when they made the film. A new film poster was later released.

Release
The film was released via streaming in Vivamax and had a limited release on March 5, 2021.

Soundtrack

 Tililing
Performed by Yumi Lacsamana, Nicole Omillo, Katrina Velarde
Words and music by Thyro Alfaro and Yumi Lacsamana
Published by Viva Music Philippines, Inc.
Produced and arranged by Thyro Alfaro
Mixed and mastered by Thyro Alfaro and Yumi Lacsamana
Nicole Omillo's vocals recorded by Thyro Alfaro at LoudBox Studios
Katrina Velarde's vocals recorded by Dennis Tolentino at Viva Recording Studios
Courtesy of Viva Records Corporation.

 Mamang Sorbetero
Performed by Donnalyn Bartolome
Composed by Jose Mari Chan and Gryk Ortaleza (as Eduard 'Gryk' Ortaleza)
Published by Signature Music, Inc.
Arranged by Tommy Katigbak
Produced by Civ Fontanilla
Mixed and mastered by Joel Mendoza (as Joserlito Mendoza)
Recorded by Ponz Martinez at Viva Recording Studios
Courtesy of Viva Records Corporation.

Reception
JE CC of LionhearTV give the film 1 out of 5 rating and wrote:

References

External links
 ''
 

Films set in psychiatric hospitals
Films not released in theaters due to the COVID-19 pandemic
Films postponed due to the COVID-19 pandemic
2021 black comedy films